SLSU may refer to:
 Southern Leyte State University
 Southern Luzon State University
 ICAO code for Juana Azurduy de Padilla International Airport in Sucre, Bolivia.